Toxopeia demodes is a species of sedge moth, and the only species in the genus Toxopeia. It was described by Alexey Diakonoff in 1955. It is found in New Guinea.

References

Moths described in 1955
Glyphipterigidae